Sir John Peachey, 2nd Baronet  (c. 1680–1744), of West Dean, Sussex, was a British landowner and Tory politician who sat in the House of Commons from 1738 to 1744.

Peachey was the fourth, but second surviving son of William Peachey, a London merchant, with an estate at Petworth. He married, by licence dated 15 March 1706, Henrietta London, daughter of George London, principal gardener to Queen Anne. In 1719, he was  a captain in the 7th Foot. He succeeded his brother Sir Henry Peachey, 1st Baronet in the baronetcy on 23 August 1737.
 
Peachey was returned as Member of Parliament for Midhurst at a by-election on 3 February 1738  in succession to his brother, Sir Henry Peachey. He voted with the Opposition. At the  1741 British general election  he was invited by the Tories to stand for Sussex but declined, remaining at Midhurst where he was successfully returned.  His only vote was with the Opposition on the chairman of the elections committee on 16 December 1741.

Peachey died on  9 April 1744, aged 64, leaving two sons and three daughters:
John, succeeded the baronetcy as Sir John Peachey, 3rd Baronet.
James
Henrietta
Rebecca
Mary, mother of Elizabeth Seare who married Rev. Dr. John Lockman, Canon of Windsor

References

1680s births
1744 deaths
British MPs 1734–1741
British MPs 1741–1747
Members of the Parliament of Great Britain for English constituencies
Baronets in the Baronetage of Great Britain